Northern National Bank was a historic bank building located in the Hartranft neighborhood of Philadelphia, Pennsylvania. It was built in 1893, and was a two-story, brick and stone flatiron building in the Romanesque.  It featured terra cotta and pressed metal decorative elements, and a set of pink granite steps at the main entrance. It has been demolished.

It was added to the National Register of Historic Places in 1985.

References

Bank buildings on the National Register of Historic Places in Philadelphia
Romanesque Revival architecture in Pennsylvania
Commercial buildings completed in 1893
Lower North Philadelphia